Shakila Mohseni Sedaghat, known mononymously as Shakila (born May 3, 1962), is an Iranian singer-songwriter based in San Diego, California. She is an international artist who has performed in various languages including Persian, Kurdish, English, Turkish, Hindi and Spanish. She has won a Persian Music Academy Award in 2006 and a Global Music Award in 2015. Shakila has released over twenty albums in Persian language as well as many albums in English. She primarily sings about spirituality, love, peace, and awakening. Lyrics of her songs are inspired by Rumi and other major poets. She is also an official voting member at the Grammy Awards.

Career
Shakila started her professional career at the age of nine when she was invited to perform on an Iranian television show. Later, she moved to San Diego where she studied music at Palomar College. Shakila released her debut album titled Kami Ba Man Modaaraa Kon in 1990. Her second album, Geryeh Dar Ragbar, was released in 1992. In 1993, Shakila signed with Persian record label, Taraneh Records and released her third album Gheybate Noor.

From 1997 to 2008, Shakila was signed with Los Angeles based record label Caltex Records and she released more than eight albums with them. In 2013, Shakila founded her own record label Shakila Enterprises. She has released over ten singles on her record label.

In 2014, Shakila released her single Treasure Within which reached the peak position of No. 1 at various Billboard Charts. Her album 11:11 City of Love was released in 2015. 11:11 City of Love spent more than 43 weeks at No. 1 positions at multiple charts at Billboard. In 2016, Shakila released her album Splashing Tears which also stayed at the peak position of No. 1 at the Billboard charts for several weeks. Shakila has won Persian Music Academy Award in 2006 and Global Music Award in 2015. She has been nominated twice at the Hollywood Music in Media Awards.

Awards
Persian Music Academy Award- (2006)
Global Music Awards- (2015)
Hollywood Music in Media Awards- Nominated Twice
One World Music Awards- Nominated (2015)

Discography

See also 
Persian traditional music
List of famous Persian women

References

External links 

Shakila on Spotify

Living people
Iranian classical singers
21st-century Iranian women singers
Iranian women pop singers
Iranian folk singers
20th-century Iranian women singers
1962 births